HD 155035 is the Henry Draper Catalogue designation for a star in the constellation Ara, the Altar. This is a red giant star with a stellar classification of M1.5 III. It an irregular variable that changes brightness over an amplitude range of 0.12 magnitudes.

References

External links
 HR 6374
 Image HD 155035

Ara (constellation)
Slow irregular variables
155035
084105
6374
Arae, V854
Durchmusterung objects
M-type giants